is a 1991 Japanese comedy horror film directed by Katsuhiro Otomo, with a screenplay by Otomo and Keiko Nobumoto from a story by Satoshi Kon. The film stars Sabu (credited as Hiroki Tanaka) as a yakuza henchman who encounters the language barrier and evil spirits in his attempts to evict a Tokyo apartment full of foreigners.

Sabu received the Best New Actor Award at the Yokohama Film Festival in 1992. A manga adaptation by Kon was published by Kodansha, under the same title, on August 1, 1991.

References

External links 
 

1991 films
Films directed by Katsuhiro Otomo
Films set in apartment buildings
Yakuza films
1990s Japanese films